Arena is a 2011 American independent action film directed by Jonah Loop, and starring Kellan Lutz and Samuel L. Jackson. The film is about an illegal web show pitting fighters against each other in a gladiatorial combat.

Plot
The Deathgames is a popular, controversial, and illegal web-show featuring a modern day gladiator arena where combatants fight to the death for the entertainment of online viewers, including a group of college students, and a group of Singaporean office workers. Government authorities have been searching to shut down the operation, but to no avail. David Lord (Kellan Lutz), a fireman and paramedic, gets into a terrible car accident with his pregnant girlfriend, Lori (Nina Dobrev), who does not survive the crash. Grief-stricken, David contemplates suicide, but decides against it. Later he drowns his sorrows at a local bar, while a mysterious woman, Milla (Katia Winter), watches him from afar. After witnessing him easily subdue the bar's bouncer, Milla seduces David before incapacitating him and allowing him to be kidnapped.

Milla, it turns out, is a recruiter for The Deathgames, which is run by the confident Logan (Samuel L. Jackson) and his two sexy assistants Kaneko (Irene Choi) and Kawaii (Lauren Shiohama). Kaden (Johnny Messner), the executioner, is doubtful of the fighting ability of a mere "doctor." David is locked in a small cell and befriends a fellow fighter in the cell next to his, Taiga (Daniel Dae Kim), who tells him that he was coerced into participating due to a threat on his wife's life. David reluctantly wins his first fight, and Milla becomes more invested in his success (as she gets paid when he wins). Logan tells David that he will set him free if he wins ten fights in a row.

In order to persuade David to fight again, Kaden reveals that Taiga's wife is in their hands and will be killed if he fails to win his next fight. After David wins, it is revealed that his opponent was Taiga, who was given the same task for his wife. Remorsefully, David kills Taiga, but not before incurring serious wounds of his own. It is then that David officially accepts Logan's offer (win ten battles and he will be set free), on the one condition: the tenth and final opponent must be Kaden himself.

Milla begins to feel bad for David after seeing how badly he is hurt and personally attends to his wounds. She becomes closer to him as he fights his next few fights and has him moved to a more comfortable room with more space and a bed. She brings him food and women. After each fight she personally dresses his wounds. Eventually she realizes her attraction to him, dyes her hair black (as was David's wife) and Milla and David have sex.

For the penultimate fight, Kaden arranges for the release of a South African serial killer named Brutus Jackson (Derek Mears), which leads Logan to believe that Kaden is afraid of David. Before the fight, David tells Milla to contact his brother Sam, who he has not seen since the car accident. She does so, but Sam does not seem to want to hear from David. David defeats Brutus in brutal fight, and Logan is distressed. Logan has a doctor create a serum to inject into David, which will slow him down and make him an easy victim for Kaden in their fight.

Large crowds watch online as Kaden initially pummels David, but much to Logan's surprise, David begins to gain the heavy advantage. As they fight, it is revealed through flashbacks that "David Lord" is the assumed name of a secret government agent (surname Searle) who was specifically sent to infiltrate The Deathgames. The phone call to "Sam" was in order to alert his superior, Agent McCarty (James Remar), about his location via phone tracing. It is also revealed that Milla secretly switched Logan's serum with a simple saline solution prior to the fight. A group of American soldiers invade the facility and arrest Milla, Kaneko, and Kawaii. Filled with rage after defeating and killing Kaden, David hunts down Logan and corners him in a stockroom. As David is about to strike the deadly blow, soldiers arrive, snapping David out of his murderous fury. Logan escapes.

Agent McCarty consoles David as he deals with the fact that he had to kill so many people and assures him that Logan will be caught. Milla apologizes to David as she is escorted away, and McCarty assures David that she is in good hands.

Cast

Development
The film had a budget of around $10 million. Filming began in May 2010 in Louisiana. The script was written by Michael Hultquist, Robert Martinez and Tony Giglio. Filming took place in Baton Rouge, Louisiana.

According to Heat Vision, visual effects veteran Jonah Loop made his directorial debut with this indie film.

Reception
Arena has received mostly negative reviews, with an aggregate 25% on Rotten Tomatoes. Criticism focused mostly on the hammy script and shallow plot.

References

 http://www.empireonline.com/news/feed.asp?NID=27604
 https://web.archive.org/web/20100602124613/http://www.horror-movies.ca/horror_18212.html
 http://www.heatvisionblog.com/2010/04/samuel-l-jackson-kellan-lutz-eyeing-deathsport-exclusive.html
 http://www.movieweb.com/news/NE65E766TQ1C96
 https://web.archive.org/web/20110726072820/http://screencrave.com/2010-04-16/samuel-l-jackson-and-kellan-lutz-join-deathgames/
 https://www.reuters.com/article/idUSTRE63K0TB20100421
 http://www.movieweb.com/news/NEmvKsmvViIcqm

External links
 

American action films
2011 action films
2011 films
Films about death games
Films about gladiatorial combat
Films shot in Louisiana
Stage 6 Films films
2010s English-language films
2010s American films